WCMJ (96.7 FM) is a Hot Adult Contemporary radio station in Cambridge, Ohio, owned locally by AVC Communications, Inc. The station broadcasts with a power of 2,300 Watts and is simply known as "96FM" to listeners. 96FM has been using the call sign WCMJ since May 1, 1984.

External links
WCMJ official website
AVC Communications, Inc. website

CMJ
Contemporary hit radio stations in the United States